Rosina Ntshetsana Komane is a South African politician who has been a Member of Parliament (MP) in the National Assembly of South Africa since May 2019. Komane is a member of the Economic Freedom Fighters party.

In June 2019, she was elected as an alternate member of the Standing Committee on Appropriations. She became an alternate member of the  Portfolio Committee on Public Enterprises on 6 May 2020. Komane was appointed to the Portfolio Committee on Public Service and Administration, Performance Monitoring & Evaluation on 4 September 2020.

References

External links
Ms Rosina Ntshetsana Komane at Parliament of South Africa

Living people
Year of birth missing (living people)
Economic Freedom Fighters politicians
Members of the National Assembly of South Africa
Women members of the National Assembly of South Africa
21st-century South African politicians
21st-century South African women politicians